Colyer is a small unincorporated community south of the borough of Centre Hall in central Potter Township, Centre County, Pennsylvania, United States.

History 
The community takes its name from Colyer's Sawmill, which once stood near the intersection of Bubb and Colyer Roads.  A combined general store/post office was located nearby, but was converted to a private residence in the late 1940s.  Of three churches that originally operated within Colyer's boundaries, only the Colyer Brethren in Christ (BIC) Church maintains an active congregation.

Recreation 
Within the Colyer geographic area is Colyer Lake, a 77-acre body of water supported by the Colyer Lake Dam.  Constructed in the late 1960s by the Commonwealth of Pennsylvania's Fish & Boat Commission, the dam was extensively renovated in 2017, at which time a 2.5-mile hiking trail that traverses the entire perimeter of the lake was opened to the public.

References

Unincorporated communities in Centre County, Pennsylvania
Unincorporated communities in Pennsylvania